Jaime (sometimes spelled Xaime) Hernandez (born 1959) is the co-creator of the alternative comic book Love and Rockets with his brothers Gilbert and Mario.

Early life
Jaime Hernandez grew up in Oxnard, California. He is the youngest of his family, with four older brothers and one sister. His family embraced comics: their mother read them frequently and old issues were kept in large quantities in the house, to be read and re-read by all over the years. "We grew up with comics," Hernandez said. "I wanted to draw comics my whole life."

They read all types of comics and enjoyed those that gave a fairly realistic depiction of family life as well as the standard superhero adventures. Hernandez was particularly influenced by Hank Ketcham's Dennis the Menace and Dan DeCarlo's Archie' comics. The children in his otherwise rather realistic stories are often drawn to resemble Ketcham's, and Jaime's characters often strike very "DeCarlo-esque" poses. The work of Alex Toth, Charles Schulz, Jesse Marsh and Jack Kirby were also hugely influential.

Hernandez has a lifelong fascination with pro wrestling, especially women's wrestling, and it has been a regular part of his work. Hernandez has also been a lifelong punk rock fan. In addition to playing in bands himself it has been a constant element of his work. His heroine Maggie and her friends are almost all punk fans; he also has done a series of stories about the career of another main character (Hopey) as a bass player for a luckless punk band.

Career

Jaime's main contribution to Love and Rockets is the ongoing serial narrative Locas which follows the tangled lives of a group of primarily Latina characters, from their teenage years in the early days of the California punk scene to the present day. The two central characters of Jaime's cast are Margarita Luisa "Maggie" Chascarrillo and Esperanza Leticia "Hopey" Glass, whose on-again, off-again, open romance is a focus for many Locas storylines. Early on, the stories switched back and forth between Maggie's sci-fi adventures journeying around the world and working as a "prosolar" mechanic repairing rocketships, and much more realistic stories of Maggie and her friends in a grungy, mostly Latin California neighborhood known as "Hoppers". Eventually Hernandez dropped almost all of the sci-fi elements, although he does still occasionally include references to the earlier stories and he still does very occasional short stories about superheroines, robots and other sci-fi genre elements.

The Hernandez brothers announced they were ending Love and Rockets with issue 50, and that they would be doing solo books from then on. For the next few years, the brothers released many solo books, with Jaime doing several books featuring his Locas characters (including Whoa Nellie, Penny Century, and Maggie and Hopey Color Fun) and Maggie generally occupying a supporting role. Eventually they resumed doing Love and Rockets and Maggie again took center stage, but instead of the large, magazine-style format of the original issues, the book was now released in a more traditional comic book format.

The entire Locas storyline to date was collected into one 700 page graphic novel in 2004.

Hernandez has been praised for the physical beauty of his female characters as well as their complex personalities, and for years he struggled to create comparably nuanced male characters. Hernandez has often said that Maggie and Ray Dominguez both represent different aspects of his own personality.

In an interview with The Comics Journal, Hernandez admitted he'd had difficulty aging his characters, because while he'd known girls like Maggie and Hopey when he was young, he'd never known them long enough to find out what they did in adulthood.

Other work
In addition to his Locas stories, Hernandez has also done occasional work for DC Comics and The New Yorker, and he has done many album covers for such artists as Michelle Shocked. Earlier in his career Hernandez also did album covers for some "Nardcore" punk bands, such as Ill Repute and Dr. Know, the latter of whom featured his younger brother Ismael on bass. Hernandez contributed his artwork for the Indigo Girls' 2004 album All That We Let In. In September 2006, Hernandez also created the artwork for the critically acclaimed Los Lobos album The Town and the City. In 1984-85 Gilbert, Mario and Jaime collaborated on Mister X, a sci-fi comic book series from Vortex Press, with Jaime handling the art and Gilbert and Mario plotting. The book's noirish look has been cited as an influence by the creators of Batman: The Animated Series among other retro-futuristic works. The Hernandez brothers themselves hold little affection for it, however, with Gilbert once describing it being "like a bad zit... it just sort of happened." The Hernandez brothers left the book when Vortex failed to pay them in full. Responding to the non-payment accusations, publisher Bill Marks said "I don't dispute that one bit. And they'll be paid every nickel of it, or every quarter of it." The Hernandez brothers were indeed ultimately paid for their work on Mister X in 1988.

In 2006, Publishers Weekly ranked Hernandez' work Ghost of Hoppers second on its critics' poll of the best comic books of 2006.

Awards
 1986 Kirby Award – Best Artist, Best Black-and-White Comic (Love and Rockets)
 1986 Inkpot Award
 1989 Harvey Award – Best Continuing or Limited Series (Love and Rockets)
 1990 Harvey Award – Best Continuing or Limited Series (Love and Rockets)
 1992 Harvey Award – Best Inker (Love and Rockets)
 1998 Harvey Award – Best New Series (Penny Century)
 1999 Harvey Award – Best Single Issue (Penny Century #3)
 2000 Harvey Award – Best Inker (Penny Century)
 2001 Harvey Award – Best Artist or Penciller (Penny Century)
 2003 Harvey Award – Best Inker (Love and Rockets)
 2004 Harvey Award – Best Single Issue or Story (Love and Rockets #9)
 2006 Harvey Award – Best Single Issue (Love and Rockets, Volume 2, #15)
 2007 Harvey Award – Best Cartoonist (Love and Rockets)
 2012 Ignatz Award - Outstanding Artist (Love and Rockets New Stories)
 2013 Harvey Award - Best Cartoonist (Love and Rockets New Stories) 
 2014 Eisner Award - Best Writer/Artist (Love and Rockets New Stories #6)
 2014 Los Angeles Times Book Prize - Best Graphic Novel/Comics

References

Sources

Further reading

External links

Jaime Hernandez at Fantagraphics
Review of Jaime's solo work at The Comics Interpreter
Review of Love & Rockets
 Jaime Hernandez interview with Suicide Girl
Long list of Love and Rockets links
Character index for Jaime's Hoppers/Locas stories - About 187 characters appear at least once in Jaime's work; 65 of these appear more than once.
Jaime Hernandez interview
 Scholarly article that sets Jaime Hernandez's work in historical/theoretical context

 
1959 births
Alternative cartoonists
American comics artists
American comics writers
American graphic novelists
American writers of Mexican descent
Harvey Award winners for Best Artist or Penciller
Harvey Award winners for Best Cartoonist
Ignatz Award winners for Outstanding Artist
Living people
People from Oxnard, California
Inkpot Award winners